Otto Warburg may refer to:

Otto Warburg (botanist) (1859–1938), German botanist
Otto Heinrich Warburg (1883–1970), German physiologist